River Forest may refer to the following locations in the United States:

 River Forest, Illinois
River Forest (Metra), a railroad station
 River Forest, Indiana